Song Soon-Chun (Hangul: 송순천, Hanja: 宋順天) (15 January 1934 – 15 October 2019) was a South Korean amateur boxer who won a silver medal at 1956 Summer Olympics in Melbourne, Australia.

Career
Song was born in Seoul and competed for South Korea in the 1956 Summer Olympics held in Melbourne, Australia. In the bantamweight boxing event, he captured the silver medal. His silver medal was South Korea's first silver medal at the Olympic Games.

Song participated in the Olympics one more time in 1960, moving up in weight to featherweight, but was eliminated in the second round by eventual gold medalist Francesco Musso of Italy.

1956 Olympic results
Below are the bouts of Song Soon-Chun, who competed for South Korea as a bantamweight in the 1956 Olympic boxing tournament in Melbourne, Australia:

 1st Round: defeated Alberto Adela (Philippines) on points
 Round of 16: defeated Robert Bath (Australia) on points
 Quarterfinal: defeated Carmelo Tomaselli (Argentina) on points
 Semifinal: defeated Claudio Barrientos (Chile) on points
 Final: lost to Wolfgang Behrendt (Germany) on points; was awarded silver medal

Post competitive sports career
After receiving his PhD, Song served as a full professor at Yong-In University for 22 years. He was the leader of the Korean Olympian Association, which consisted of the corps of South Korea's Olympic medalists.

Results

References

External links
Sports-reference

1934 births
Sportspeople from Seoul
Olympic boxers of South Korea
Olympic silver medalists for South Korea
Boxers at the 1956 Summer Olympics
Boxers at the 1960 Summer Olympics
2019 deaths
Olympic medalists in boxing
Asian Games medalists in boxing
Boxers at the 1958 Asian Games
South Korean male boxers
Medalists at the 1956 Summer Olympics
Asian Games bronze medalists for South Korea
Medalists at the 1958 Asian Games
Bantamweight boxers